The Barclay Hotel was located at 237 S. 18th St. in Philadelphia, Pennsylvania on Rittenhouse Square. Opened in October 1929, it was, at one time, the most famous hotel in the city, and was owned by the well-known developer John McShain. After a later owner went into bankruptcy in 1992, the property was sold in 1994 and was converted to condominiums.

The hotel was the site of the FBI's Abscam sting operation in 1980, which exposed corruption in government. Federal agents posing as Arab sheikhs rented a suite here, where they solicited the help of local, state and federal officials.

The hotel was first put up for sale in 1989 for approximately $30 million. In April 1992, owner Barclay Hotel Associates filed for Chapter 11 bankruptcy. The property was purchased by Princeton developer Peter Marks for $4.3 million on Monday, October 31, 1994. Construction on the Barclay Condominiums was completed in 2005.

Literary references
The narrator of Nicholson Baker's novel The Fermata first discovers his ability to "freeze time" while staying at the Barclay Hotel as a child.

References

External links

Hotels in Philadelphia
Rittenhouse Square, Philadelphia
1929 establishments in Pennsylvania
1994 disestablishments in Pennsylvania